Veal liver and bacon is a dish containing veal liver and bacon.

History
Cookbook authors such as Xavier Raskin (1922) have suggested that the dish was French in origin. It appears in American cookbooks as early as 1857, and in Scotland as early as 1862.
  
For many years, liver was quite inexpensive in the United States, as many Americans were not interested in it.  As Americans became more cosmopolitan in their tastes, they learned to appreciate new dishes.  This trend, combined with the discovery of the nutritive value of iron-rich liver, caused an increase in demand for, and the price of, liver. While the "simple" and "homely" dish is found frequently in cookbooks that feature inexpensive foods, such as the 1898 Practical Cookery Manual of Plain and Middle Class Recipes, it is also featured in The White House Cookbook by Hugo Ziemann, who was a White House steward. 

For some restaurants, liver and bacon was a signature dish: in 1925, the Homestead Room in St. Petersburg, Florida, took out a full-page ad praising its calf's liver and bacon.  In 2004, the American Good Housekeeping cookbook referred to the dish as "classic", a status reinforced by its occurrence in such famous cookbooks as Isabella Beeton's Mrs Beeton's Book of Household Management and Christian Isobel Johnstone's The Cook and Housewife's Manual.

Preparation
Slices of bacon are fried and slices of veal liver (often covered in flour) are sauteed in the rendered fat. The bacon and slices of liver are placed in a dish and covered with a gravy made with the fond. Many recipes call for the liver to be scalded first.

It is imperative that the dish be served quickly, as the liver ought to be eaten when hot and tender. Besides at dinner or supper (Mrs Beeton suggests it aux fines herbes as an entree in a copious meal), one finds calf's liver and bacon as a breakfast meat also, for instance in the Sherwood hotel in Florida, 1903.

References

Bacon dishes
Veal dishes
British cuisine
French cuisine
Food combinations
Liver (food)
Historical foods in American cuisine